Extremal graph theory is a branch of combinatorics, itself an area of mathematics, that lies at the intersection of extremal combinatorics and graph theory. In essence, extremal graph theory studies how global properties of a graph influence local substructure.

Results in extremal graph theory deal with quantitative connections between various graph properties, both global (such as the number of vertices and edges) and local (such as the existence of specific subgraphs), and problems in extremal graph theory can often be formulated as optimization problems: how big or small a parameter of a graph can be, given some constraints that the graph has to satisfy?

A graph that is an optimal solution to such an optimization problem is called an extremal graph, and extremal graphs are important objects of study in extremal graph theory.

Extremal graph theory is closely related to fields such as Ramsey theory, spectral graph theory, computational complexity theory, and additive combinatorics, and frequently employs the probabilistic method.

History

Mantel's Theorem (1907) and Turán's Theorem (1941) were some of the first milestones in the study of extremal graph theory.
 
In particular, Turán's theorem would later on become a motivation for the finding of results such as the Erdős–Stone theorem (1946). This result is surprising because it connects the chromatic number with the maximal number of edges in an -free graph. An alternative proof of Erdős–Stone was given in 1975, and utilised the Szemerédi regularity lemma, an essential technique in the resolution of extremal graph theory problems.

Topics and concepts

Graph coloring

A proper (vertex) coloring of a graph  is a coloring of the vertices of  such that no two adjacent vertices have the same color. Determining the chromatic number of specific graphs is a fundamental question in extremal graph theory, because many problems in the area and related areas can be formulated in terms of graph coloring.

When  is a planar graph, the four-color theorem states that  has chromatic number at most four.

In general, determining whether a given graph has a coloring with a prescribed number of colors is known to be NP-hard.

In addition to vertex coloring, other types of coloring are also studied, such as edge colorings.

Forbidden subgraphs

The forbidden subgraph problem is one of the central problems in extremal graph theory.

The problem of determining the asymptotics of  when  is a bipartite graph is open; when  is a complete bipartite graph, this is known as the Zarankiewicz problem.

Homomorphism density

The forbidden subgraph problem can be restated as maximizing the edge density of a graph with -density zero, and this naturally leads to generalization in the form of graph homomorphism inequalities, which are inequalities relating  for various graphs .
By extending the homomorphism density to graphons, which are objects that arise as a limit of dense graphs, the graph homomorphism density can be written in the form of integrals, and inequalities such as the Cauchy-Schwarz inequality and Hölder's inequality can be used to derive homomorphism inequalities.

Graph regularity

Szemerédi's regularity lemma states that all graphs are 'regular' in the following sense: the vertex set of any given graph can be partitioned into a bounded number of parts such that the bipartite graph between most pairs of parts behave like random bipartite graphs.
This partition gives a structural approximation to the original graph, which reveals information about the properties of the original graph.

The regularity lemma is a central result in extremal graph theory, and also has numerous applications in the adjacent fields of additive combinatorics and computational complexity theory. In addition to (Szemerédi) regularity, closely related notions of graph regularity such as strong regularity and Frieze-Kannan weak regularity have also been studied, as well as extensions of regularity to hypergraphs. 

Applications of graph regularity often utilize forms of counting lemmas and removal lemmas. In simplest forms, the graph counting lemma uses regularity between pairs of parts in a regular partition to approximate the number of subgraphs, and the graph removal lemma states that given a graph with few copies of a given subgraph, we can remove a small number of edges to eliminate all copies of the subgraph.

See also

Related fields
 Ramsey theory
 Ramsey-Turán theory
 Spectral graph theory
 Additive combinatorics
 Computational complexity theory
 Probabilistic combinatorics

Techniques and methods
 Probabilistic method
 Dependent random choice
 Container method
 Hypergraph regularity method

Theorems and conjectures (in addition to ones mentioned above)
 Ore's theorem
 Ruzsa–Szemerédi problem

References